Steven McCaffery (born January 24, 1947) is a Canadian poet and scholar who was a professor at York University.  He currently holds the David Gray Chair at the University at Buffalo, The State University of New York. McCaffery was born in Sheffield, England and lived in the UK for most of his youth attending University of Hull.  

He moved to Toronto in 1968. In 1970, he began to collaborate with fellow poets Rafael Barreto-Rivera, Paul Dutton, and bpNichol, forming the sound-poetry group,  The Four Horsemen. Some of McCaffery's poetry attempts to break language from the logic of syntax and structure to create a purely emotional response. He has created three-dimensional structures of words and has released a number of sound and video works, often in collaboration with other poets.

Bibliography 

Carnival – 1967–1975
Dr. Sadhu's Muffins – 1974
Ow's Waif – 1975
 Sound Poetry – A Survey – 1978
Intimate Distortions – 1979
Knowledge Never Knew – 1983
Panopticon – 1984
North of Intention: Critical Writings 1973–1986 – 1986
Evoba – 1987
The Black Debt – 1989
Theory of Sediment – 1991 (nominated for a Governor General's Award)
 
The Cheat of Words – 1996
Seven Pages Missing – 2000 (nominated for a Governor General's Award)
Prior to Meaning: The Protosematic and Poetics  – 2001
The Basho Variations – 2007

Critical studies and reviews of McCaffery's work
Rational geomancy

See also

Canadian literature
Canadian poetry
List of Canadian poets

References

External links
 McCaffery Programs
Buffalo EPC
 Reading at SUNY-Buffalo
Rain Taxi interview with McCaffery
Records of Steve McCaffery are held by Simon Fraser University's Special Collections and Rare Books

1947 births
Living people
20th-century Canadian poets
Canadian male poets
Writers from Sheffield
Language poets
Academic staff of York University
University at Buffalo faculty
21st-century Canadian poets
20th-century Canadian male writers
21st-century Canadian male writers